2010 Academy Awards may refer to:

 82nd Academy Awards, the Academy Awards ceremony which took place in 2010, honoring the best in film for 2009.
 83rd Academy Awards, the Academy Awards ceremony which took place in 2011, honoring the best in film for 2010.
 Academy Award nominations for the 1984 film 2010: The Year We Make Contact